Tovste can refer to:
 Tovste (urban-type settlement), a town in Chortkiv Raion of Ternopil Oblast, Ukraine.
 Tovste (village), a village in Chortkiv Raion of Ternopil Oblast, Ukraine.
 Tłuste, another name for the village in Masovian Voivodeship, Poland.